This is a list of submissions to the 83rd Academy Awards for Best Foreign Language Film.  The Academy of Motion Picture Arts and Sciences has invited the film industries of various countries to submit their best film for the Academy Award for Best Foreign Language Film every year since the award was created in 1956. The award is presented annually by the Academy to a feature-length motion picture produced outside the United States that contains primarily non-English dialogue. The Foreign Language Film Award Committee oversees the process and reviews all the submitted films.

The deadline for all countries to send in their submissions was 1 October 2010. The submitted motion pictures must be first released theatrically in their respective countries between 1 October 2009, and 30 September 2010.  In total, 66 countries submitted films for consideration, including first-time submissions from Greenland and Ethiopia.

A shortlist of nine semi-finalists was announced on 19 January 2011. The final list of five nominees was announced on 25 January 2011, at the Samuel Goldwyn Theater in Los Angeles. The Danish entry, In a Better World, was announced as the winner at the 83rd Academy Awards on 27 February 2011.

Submissions

Notes 

  Vietnam has submitted four films in the past five years. Their official nominating body, the Vietnam Cinema Administration's International Relations Department, has indicated an interest in participating and has said they have nine eligible films. However, they had made no official announcement.
  Taiwan originally chose Hear Me, which was deemed to be ineligible since its August 2009 release date meant that it was eligible only for the previous year.
 Cuba, Lithuania, and Luxembourg informed Variety before the deadline that they would not participate in this year's competition.

References

External links 
 Official website of the Academy Awards

2009 in American cinema
2010 in American cinema
2009 film awards
2010 film awards
83